A catapult is a device used to throw or hurl a projectile a great distance without the aid of explosive devices.

Catapult(s) or Catapulte  may also refer to:

Computing
 Catapult C, a high-level synthesis tool
 Catapult, codename for Microsoft Proxy Server version 1.0, precursor of Microsoft Forefront Threat Management Gateway
 Catapult, a GUI for openMSX, an open source emulator for the MSX home computer architecture

Media and entertainment

Film
 Staten Island Catapult, a documentary by Gregorio Smith
 Catapult, a 2009 film set in Berlin

Music

Artists
 Catapult (band), a Dutch Glam rock band
 Elizabeth & The Catapult, the pseudonym of singer-songwriter Elizabeth Ziman
 Catapult, former name of Dutch pop duo Fantastique

Albums
 Catapult, an album by American rock musician Scott Helland

Songs
 "Catapult" (song), a track from the album Recovering the Satellites by American rock band Counting Crows
 "Catapult", a track from the album A Picture of Nectar by American rock band Phish
 "Catapult", a track from the album Gloves by Australian pop band Operator Please
 "Catapult", a track from the album Humbug by English rock band Arctic Monkeys
 "Catapult", a track from the album Murmur by American rock band R.E.M.
 "Catapult", a track from the album Written in Scars by Italian-English singer Jack Savoretti 
 Catapult, an EP by British drum and bass duo Calyx

Television
 "Catapult", an episode of British children's TV series Bodger & Badger
 "Catapult", an episode of US TV series Doing DaVinci
 "Catapulte", an episode of French TV series Minuscule
 Catapult, an event in the UK TV series Gladiators
 Catapult, a challenge in the US TV series Knights and Warriors
 Catapulte, a game in the French TV series Fort Boyard

Games
 Catapult, a Czech arcade video game

Comics
 Catapult, a member of the Exiles, a Malibu Comics superhero team
 Catapult, a member of the Hellenders, a DC Comics superhero team

Military
 M-46 Catapult, an Indian self-propelled Howitzer field gun
 Operation Catapult, a naval battle in the Second World War, also known as the Attack on Mers-el-Kébir
 Aircraft catapult, a steam or electromagnetic device used to launch aircraft from ships
 USS Catapult (LSM-445), later reclassified (YV-1), a US Navy Landing Ship Medium of World War II
 Catapulte, a French Navy Arquebuse-class destroyer of World War I

Science
 Catapult effect, an effect in electromagnetics

Amusement park rides
 Catapult (ride), a ride at Six Flags New England amusement park
 The Catapult, a ride at Lagoon amusement park, Utah
 Le Catapult, a ride at Busch Gardens Williamsburg amusement park, Virginia
 La Catapulte, a ride at La Ronde amusement park, Montreal

Companies
 Catapult Sports, a manufacturer of wearable technology for athletes
 Catapult, a publisher and magazine founded by Elizabeth Koch

Other
 Catapult, a bungee jump variation
 Catapult, a crowdfunding platform set up by Women Deliver, a global reproductive health advocacy organization
 Catapult, a dance work by American dance company Diavolo Dance Theater
 Catapult, a line of athletic shoes by LA Gear
 Catapult, a professional wrestling throw
 Catapult centres, a network of centres for industrial innovation set up by the funding agency Innovate UK
 Catapult, another name for a Slingshot

See also
 Katapult (disambiguation)